Glen Michael 'Gondo' Gondrezick (August 30, 1955 – April 27, 2009) was an American basketball player who operated as either a shooting guard or a small forward (swingman).

Basketball career
Born in Boulder, Colorado, he attended Boulder High School in his hometown. The 6'6" Gondrezick played collegiately at University of Nevada, Las Vegas. A starter on the Runnin' Rebels' first Final Four team in 1977, his jersey  number 25 would be retired by the program twenty years later.

Gondrezick was drafted by the New York Knicks in 1977, in the second round (26th pick overall). He competed in six NBA seasons, appearing for the Knicks (two years) and the Denver Nuggets (four), and averaging six points, four rebounds, and one assist in 435 regular season matches.

Gondrezick later became a broadcaster for the UNLV basketball team. He would also call the Mountain West Conference men's basketball tournament games for the Mountain West Radio Network from 2000–2008 before dying of complications from heart surgery on April 27, 2009, at the age of 53. He had received a heart transplant in September of the previous year.

Personal
Gondrezick's younger brother, Grant, was also a professional basketball player, and a shooting guard. He played two years in the NBA.

On July 23, 1987, Gondrezick shot himself after an altercation with his wife. He acknowledged to authorities that the gunshot wound to the left side of the chest was self-inflicted.

References

External links
Stats at Basketball-Reference

1955 births
2009 deaths
American expatriate basketball people in Italy
American men's basketball players
Basketball players from Colorado
Denver Nuggets players
Libertas Liburnia Basket Livorno players
New York Knicks draft picks
New York Knicks players
Heart transplant recipients
Shooting guards
Small forwards
Sportspeople from Boulder, Colorado
UNLV Runnin' Rebels basketball players